Dominik Leder (born 4 October 1964) was a Swiss footballer who played in the 1980s. He played as goalkeeper.

Leder played his youth football with Concordia Basel and advanced to their first team during the 1983–84 season to the 1st League, the third tier of Swiss football.

Leder joined FC Basel's first team for their 1984–85 season under head-coach Ernst August Künnecke and Emil Müller. During his first two seasons with Basel Leder played only in test games. He played his domestic league debut for the club in the home game in the St. Jakob Stadium on 23 May 1987 as Basel were beaten 2–4 by Luzern.

Between the years 1984 and 1987 Leder played a total of 17 games for Basel. Four of these games were in the Nationalliga A and 13 were friendly games.

References

Sources
 
 Die ersten 125 Jahre. Publisher: Josef Zindel im Friedrich Reinhardt Verlag, Basel. 
 Verein "Basler Fussballarchiv" Homepage

FC Concordia Basel players
FC Basel players
Swiss men's footballers
Association football goalkeepers
1964 births
Living people
Swiss Super League players